Arthur Tavern is a historic inn and tavern building located at Arthur in Oswego County, New York.  It consists of a 2-story main block, three bays wide and four bays deep, with a -story wing. It is constructed of grey sandstone and built around 1838.

It was listed on the National Register of Historic Places on November 14, 1991.

References

Drinking establishments on the National Register of Historic Places in New York (state)
Federal architecture in New York (state)
Taverns on the National Register of Historic Places in New York (state)
Buildings and structures in Oswego County, New York
Taverns in New York (state)
National Register of Historic Places in Oswego County, New York